The following article is a summary of the 2014–15 football season in Belgium, which is the 112th season of competitive football in the country and runs from July 2014 until June 2015.

Promotion and relegation
Team promoted to 2014–15 Belgian Pro League
 Belgian Second Division Champions: Westerlo
 Belgian Second Division Final Round Winners: Mouscron-Péruwelz

Teams relegated from 2013–14 Belgian Pro League
 15th Place: OH Leuven
 16th Place: Mons

Teams promoted to 2014–15 Belgian Second Division
 Belgian Third Division A Champions: RC Mechelen
 Belgian Third Division B Champions: Woluwe-Zaventem
 Playoff winners: Patro Eisden Maasmechelen

Teams relegated from 2013 to 2014 Belgian Second Division
 Team folded: RWDM Brussels
 18th Place: Visé
 Lost relegation playoffs: Hoogstraten

League competitions

Belgian First Division

Belgian Second Division

Transfers

European Club results
Champions Anderlecht qualified directly for the group stage of the Champions League, while runners-up Standard Liège started in the qualifying rounds. League numbers three and four, Club Brugge and Zulte Waregem started in the qualifying rounds of the Europa League, together with cup winners Lokeren.

Other honours

European qualification for 2015–16 summary

See also
 2014–15 Belgian Pro League
 2014–15 Belgian Cup
 2014 Belgian Super Cup
 Belgian Second Division
 Belgian Third Division: divisions A and B
 Belgian Promotion: divisions A, B, C and D

References